A Call to Us All is the fourth album from singer, songwriter, producer and composer Teri DeSario. It was recorded and mixed at Mama Jo's and mastered by Bernie Grundman at A&M Records. According to AllMusic, A Call to Us All peaked at 32 on Billboards Top Contemporary Christian music chart in 1984.

Track listing

Personnel 
Source:
Produced and arranged by – Bill Purse
Engineered and mixed by – Kevin Clark
assisted by – Steve Ford
Additional engineering by – Steve Ford, Ed Cherney and Eddie King
Recorded and mixed at Mama Jo's, N. Hollywood
Strings Recorded at – Baby-O Recorders, Hollywood, CA
Mastered by – Berine Grundman / A&M Records
Photography by – Harry Langdon
Art Direction and Design by – Paul "Sport" Gross
Inner Sleeve Design – Steve Elowe
Makeup by – Victoria Jackson
Underwater Sequences by – Scotty Scuba
Label – Dayspring, A Division of Word Inc., Waco, Texas

Dedication
The album was dedicated to her husband and best friend Bill Purse.

References

External links 
 Teri Desario Facebook Site
 Teri and KC 'Yes, I’m Ready' video

Teri DeSario albums
1983 albums